The 2002 SEGA Sports Las Vegas Bowl was the 11th edition of the annual college football bowl game. It featured the New Mexico Lobos and the UCLA Bruins. The Bruins defeated the Lobos, 27–13. Notably the game was the first Division I-A college football game to have a female player on the field, Katie Hnida. Also, UCLA coach Ed Kezirian was victorious in his one and only appearance as a head coach. This was the second year in a row for the Las Vegas Bowl to be held on Christmas day.

Game summary
UCLA scored first on a 49-yard field goal by Nate Fikse to take an early 3–0 lead. New Mexico's Desmar Black intercepted a UCLA pass, and returned it 55 yards for a touchdown. The extra point try was blocked, giving New Mexico a 6–3 lead. An interesting note from that game was that when New Mexico sent Katie Hnida out to kick the extra point, Katie became the first woman to play in a Division I-A college football game. Since the kick was blocked, UCLA was not the first team to be scored upon by a woman in a Division I-A game. Katie would later kick two extra points against Texas State University in the fourth quarter of a 72–8 New Mexico win on August 30, 2003.

Nate Fikse's 39 yard field goal for the Bruins tied it in the second quarter, and the score remained 6–6 at halftime.

2 minutes into the third quarter, UCLA's Craig Bragg scored on a 74-yard punt return giving UCLA a 13–6 lead. In the fourth quarter, UCLA's Jarrad Page intercepted a New Mexico pass, and returned it 29 yards for a touchdown, putting UCLA up 20–6. A 1-yard Tyler Ebell scored from 1 yard out, increasing the Bruins' lead to 27–6. New Mexico scored once more on an 11-yard touchdown pass from Casey Kelly to Joe Manning. Kenny Byrd kicked the extra point, making the final score 27–13.

Scoring

First Quarter
UCLA — Nate Fikse, 49-yard field goal. 
New Mexico — Desmar Black, 55-yard interception return. Hnida’s kick blocked.

Second Quarter
UCLA — Fikse, 39-yard field goal.

Third Quarter
UCLA — Craig Bragg, 74-yard punt return. Fikse converts.

Fourth Quarter
UCLA — Jarrad Page, 29-yard interception return. Chris Griffith converts. 
UCLA — Tyler Ebell, one-yard run. Fikse converts. 
New Mexico — Joe Manning, 11-yard pass from Casey Kelly. Kenny Byrd converts

UCLA head coach Ed Kezirian
Ed Kezirian was an offensive line coach under Terry Donahue and Bob Toledo. When Toledo was fired on December 10, 2002, Kezirian became the interim head coach for the game against the New Mexico Lobos in the Las Vegas Bowl on December 25, 2002. He was victorious in his only game as Bruin head coach; UCLA won 27–13.

Aftermath
After the game, Kezirian retired from coaching undefeated and was replaced by Karl Dorrell as the UCLA Bruins head coach. He remained on the staff to continue overseeing academics for the Bruins football team. When Karl Dorrell was fired in 2007, defensive coordinator DeWayne Walker took the interim coaching duty for the 2007 Las Vegas Bowl. The Bruins lost that game.

References

External links
Review of game by USA Today

Bibliography

UCLA Football Media Guide (PDF Copy available at www.uclabruins.com)
University of New Mexico Football Media Guide (PDF Copy available at golobos.cstv.com )

Las Vegas Bowl
Las Vegas Bowl
New Mexico Lobos football bowl games
UCLA Bruins football bowl games
Las Vegas Bowl
Las Vegas Bowl